Legislative elections were held in New Caledonia on 12 May 2019.

Electoral system 
Voters elect 76 members to the assemblies of the three provinces of New Caledonia. In turn, 54 also become members of the Congress of New Caledonia. The elections used a restricted roll, which restricts voting depending on how long someone has lived in New Caledonia.

Results

References 

New Caledonia
2019 in New Caledonia
Elections in New Caledonia
New Caledonia
New Caledonia